The Euro T20 Slam is a planned professional Twenty20 cricket league. The first edition of the tournament was initially scheduled to start in August 2019, with matches to be held in Ireland, Scotland and the Netherlands. Its launch has been postponed on several occasions due to the impact of the COVID-19 pandemic.

History 
In March 2019, Cricket Scotland, Cricket Ireland and Royal Dutch Cricket Association officially announced the Euro T20 Slam. It was to start on 30 August and conclude on 22 September 2019 and feature 33 matches. The tournament was to have six city-based franchise teams, two each from Ireland, Scotland and the Netherlands. In April 2019, six cities were awarded a franchise: Belfast and Dublin in Ireland, Glasgow and Edinburgh in Scotland, and Amsterdam and Rotterdam in the Netherlands. The team names and schedule were released on 30 April 2019.

Shahid Afridi, Martin Guptill, Rashid Khan, Brendon McCullum, Eoin Morgan and Shane Watson were announced as the six icon players, and Babar Azam, JP Duminy, Chris Lynn, Luke Ronchi, Dale Steyn and Imran Tahir were announced as the six marquee players.

In June 2020, the tournament's organisers were looking to start the tournament on 20 August 2020, with all the matches played in Malahide, Ireland, due to the COVID-19 pandemic. However, the following month, the organisers confirmed that the event would be launched in 2021, because of the pandemic. In June 2021, it was announced that the league would further delayed as the planned dates in 2021 clashed with the restart of the rescheduled IPL 2021.

Teams
The teams due to participate in the first season were:

References

Twenty20 cricket leagues
Recurring sporting events established in 2019
Irish domestic cricket competitions
Dutch domestic cricket competitions
Scottish domestic cricket competitions
Professional cricket leagues
Multi-national professional sports leagues